Clubul Sportiv Universitatea "Dunărea de Jos" Galați commonly known as CS Universitatea "Dunărea de Jos" Galați, or simply as CSU Galați, was a Romanian football club based in Galați, Galați County who was founded in 1953, re-founded in 1967 and 2017 and finally dissolved in 2020. In 1976, CSU played the Cupa României Final, but lost 0–1 against Steaua București.

History
Știința Galați was founded in 1953 as a football section within the multi-sports club with the same name.

In 1961, the team is promoted in Divizia B where is playing until 1965 when gives up its place in the Divizia B to Oțelul Galați.

In 1967 was refounded, under the name of Politehnica Galați and took the place of Siderurgistul Galați in Divizia B. 

In 1972, the club changes its name to CSU Galați and after four years it has achieved the best performance in the club's history, qualifying in the final of the 1975–1976 season of Cupa României as a Divizia B team, where it lost in front of Steaua București. Because that year Steaua București also won the Divizia A championship, CSU Galați represented Romania in the European Cup Winners' Cup, being eliminated by the Portuguese team Boavista Porto.

In 1982 is merged with FCM Galați to form Dunărea CSU Galați.

In the summer of 2017 CSU Galați was refounded and after two season in Liga IV – Galați County was promoted in Liga III.

In 2020, during the winter break, CSU Galați withdrew from Liga III and was dissolved again.

Honours

Leagues 
Liga II
Runners-up (2): 1967–68, 1968–69
Liga III
Winners (1): 1979–80
Runners-up (1): 1978–79
Liga IV – Galați County
Winners (2): 2017–18, 2018–19

Cups 
Cupa României
Runners-up (1): 1975–76
Cupa României – Galați County
Winners (2): 2017–18, 2018–19

European record
European Cup Winners' Cup

UEFA Cup Winners' Cup
 First round (1) : 1976–77

League history

References

External links

Defunct football clubs in Romania
Football clubs in Galați County
Association football clubs established in 1953
Association football clubs disestablished in 2020
Liga II clubs
Liga III clubs
Liga IV clubs
University and college association football clubs
1953 establishments in Romania
2020 disestablishments in Romania